Lombard Building is a historic commercial building located at Indianapolis, Indiana.  It was built in 1893, and is a six-story, rectangular, Renaissance Revival style masonry, iron, and timber-framed building.  The two center bays are subtly bowed on the upper stories.  It is located between the Marott's Shoes Building and former Hotel Washington.

It was listed on the National Register of Historic Places in 1982.  It is located in the Washington Street-Monument Circle Historic District.

References

External links

Individually listed contributing properties to historic districts on the National Register in Indiana
Commercial buildings on the National Register of Historic Places in Indiana
Renaissance Revival architecture in Indiana
Commercial buildings completed in 1893
Commercial buildings in Indianapolis
National Register of Historic Places in Indianapolis